A fictional book is a text created specifically for a work in an imaginary narrative that is referred to, depicted, or excerpted in a story, book, film, or other fictional work, and which exists only in one or more fictional works. A fictional book may be created to add realism or depth to a larger fictional work.  For example, George Orwell's novel  Nineteen Eighty-Four has excerpts from a book by Emmanuel Goldstein entitled The Theory and Practice of Oligarchical Collectivism which provides background on concepts explored in the novel (both the named author [Goldstein] and the text on collectivism are made up by Orwell). 

A fictional book may provide the basis of the plot of a story, a common thread in a series of books or other works, or the works of a particular writer or canon of work. An example of a fictional book that is part of the plot of another work (in addition to Nineteen Eighty-Four) is Philip K. Dick's The Man in the High Castle, in which resistance member circulate a banned book entitled The Grasshopper Lies Heavy. An example of a fictional book linking a series is Encyclopedia Galactica, an imaginary set of encyclopedias created by Isaac Asimov and referred to in the novels in his Foundation Series. An example of an author referring to a fictional book in a number of unconnected works is Jack Vance's quotes from an imaginary  twelve-volume opus entitled Life by Unspiek, Baron Bodissey in Vance's novels (Bodissey is a fictional character created by Vance).

Examples
The Necronomicon in H. P. Lovecraft's books serves as a repository of recondite and evil knowledge in many of his works and the work of others. Despite the evident tongue-in-cheek origin of the book, supposedly written by the "Mad Arab Abdul al-Hazred," who was supposed to have died by being torn apart by an invisible being in an Arab marketplace in broad daylight, many have been led to believe that the book is real.
William Goldman's The Princess Bride is presented as an abridgment of The Princess Bride by "S. Morgenstern".
The story of Philip K. Dick's The Man in the High Castle revolves around another mysterious and forbidden book, written by the title character (Hawthorne Abendsen), named The Grasshopper Lies Heavy. Dick's book describes an alternate history where the Axis Powers were victorious in World War II and the United States has been divided between Japan and Nazi Germany. The book-within-a-book is an alternate history itself, depicting a world in which the Allies won the war but which is nonetheless different from our own world in several important respects. Towards the end of the story, Abendsen admits to writing The Grasshopper Lies Heavy under the direction of the I Ching (which influenced The Man in the High Castle as well). 
All of the stories in Robert W. Chambers' 1895 collection The King in Yellow feature a fictional play of the same name, which drives all readers mad and/or shows them another reality. Very little of the play is transcribed in the stories, although it is shown to be set in the kingdom of Carcosa, created by Ambrose Bierce.
Guillaume Apollinaire's short fiction "L'Hérésiarque" ("The Heresiarch" or "The Heretic") describes two heretical Christian gospels written by the excommunicated Catholic cardinal Benedetto Orfei. Orfei's heresy is that the three figures of the Trinity—the Father, the Son, and the Holy Spirit—were incarnate in Jesus' time, and were crucified alongside him. Orfei's first work is The True Gospel, describing the human life of God the Father, an embodiment of virtue about whom little is known. Orfei's second work describes the human life of God the Holy Spirit; the title of this work is not mentioned, but is referred to only as his 'second gospel'. In this 'gospel,' the Holy Spirit is a thief who willfully indulges in all manner of vice, including violating a sleeping virgin who then gives birth to Jesus Christ, or God the Son. Later, both the Holy Spirit and the Father are arrested as thieves and crucified, the latter unjustly. Orfei's heresy is intended to illustrate man's contradictory but coexistent aspects of sinner and martyr.
Fictional books and authors figure prominently in several short stories by the Argentine author Jorge Luis Borges. A few of Borges's fictional creations include The Book of Sand, Herbert Quain (author of April March, The Secret Mirror, etc.), Ts'ui Pen (author of The Garden of Forking Paths), Mir Bahadur Ali (author of The Approach to Al-Mu'tasim), as well as the imaginary Encyclopædia Britannica of the story "Tlön, Uqbar, Orbis Tertius". In "Pierre Menard, Author of the Quixote", a fictional poet named Pierre Menard attempts to recreate Don Quixote exactly as Miguel de Cervantes wrote it.
 Anthony Powell included over thirty fictional books in A Dance to the Music of Time.The books of fiction by fictional author, St. John Clarke, include Fields of Amaranth, Match Me Such Marvel, Dust Thou Art, The Heart is Highland, Never to the Philistines, E'en the Longest River, and Mimosa. Other fictional books are Death Head's Swordsman and Profiles in String by the fictional author, X Trapnel and Pistons as Engine Melody by the fictional character, Kenneth Widmerpool. Writing about Powell's fictional books, Robin Bynoe notes that there is a fictional bookcase of these works in the Powell papers. 
  William Boyd includes the fictional novel, The Girl Factory, by Logan Mountstuart in his 2002 novel, Any Human Heart. 
Stanislaw Lem wrote several books containing methods and ideas similar to Jorge Luis Borges's fiction. Between One Human Minute and A Perfect Vacuum, he reviews 19 fictional books (and one fictional lecture). In Imaginary Magnitude there are several introductions to fictional works, as well as an advertisement for a fictional encyclopedia entitled Vestrand's Extelopedia in 44 Magnetomes.
In Chuck Palahniuk's Lullaby, the characters are searching for all the remaining copies of the book Poems and Rhymes Around the World, which contains a poem that can kill anyone who hears it spoken or has it thought in their direction.
 In Vladimir Nabokov’s 1941 novel The Real Life of Sebastian Knight, the titular writer-hero is responsible for the novels The Prismatic Bezel, Success, and The Doubtful Asphodel.
The text of Mark Z. Danielewski's novel House of Leaves consists largely of the fictional book The Navidson Record by Zampanò (possibly based on Jorge Luis Borges), and commentary upon it by its discoverer and editor Johnny Truant. The Navidson Record is itself an academic critique of an apparently nonexistent or fictional documentary film of the same name, which may or may not exist in the world of House of Leaves. 
Bill Watterson placed fictional children's books in his comic strip Calvin and Hobbes, saying that he could never reveal their contents for they were surely more outrageous in the reader's imagination. For several years, Calvin (perpetually six years old) demands that his father read him Hamster Huey and the Gooey Kablooie as a bedtime story. Occasionally, his father's patience snaps and he introduces new variations, which at least reveal what the original story is not: "Do you think the townsfolk will ever find Hamster Huey's head?" An "actual" Hamster Huey book was written by Mabel Barr in 2004, years after the strip's conclusion.
"Travels With My Cats," a Hugo-nominated short story by Mike Resnick first appearing in Asimov's Science Fiction magazine, features a fictional travelogue of the same name.
Paul Levinson's novel The Plot To Save Socrates features a fictional ancient Platonic Dialogue, without title, that begins "PERSONS OF THE DIALOGUE: Socrates; Andros, a visitor. SCENE: The Prison of Socrates".
The Encyclopedia Galactica in Isaac Asimov's Foundation Series was created in Terminus at the beginning of the Foundation Era. It serves primarily as an introduction to a character, a place or a circumstance to be developed in each chapter. Each quotation contains a copyright disclaimer and cites Terminus as the place of publication. The Encyclopedia also makes an appearance in The Hitchhiker's Guide to the Galaxy by Douglas Adams.
The Hitchhiker's Guide to the Galaxy also features a fictional electronic guide book of the same name. The fictional book serves as "the standard repository for all knowledge and wisdom" for many members of the series' galaxy-spanning civilization. 
The Magicians and its sequels, written by Lev Grossman, feature a fictional series "Fillory and Further" by fictional writer Christopher Plover. The series remain a major theme and a reference point throughout The Magicians' trilogy, even when the characters arrive in actual Fillory.
The literary journal Underneath the Bunker (the title of which may refer to a song left off the track listing for the R.E.M. album Lifes Rich Pageant), founded in 2002 and online since 2005, has followed Stanislav Lem and Borges in publishing reviews of books that have never existed, such as Tosca Calbirro's Under An Unquiet Sun, or Receding Rainfall by the eccentric Bosnian novelist Hoçe.
The Book of Counted Sorrows is a book invented by horror author Dean Koontz to add verisimilitude to some of his novels. "Quotations" from this fictional book were often used to set the tone of chapters of the novels. Koontz ultimately published a version of the book.
The Anonymous Manuscript of XVII century which Alessandro Manzoni pretends to be translating in his novel The Betrothed
The work and life of the elusive German novelist Benno von Archimboldi (a fictional character) is central to two of the five parts of 2666, the last novel written by Roberto Bolaño. 
Juan de Mairena is an apocryphal author, invented by the Spanish poet Antonio Machado. According to Machado, Juan de Mairena is the author of several books about aesthetic theory, one of which is called Arte Poética (Poetic Art).  Machado devotes several essays to analyze the aesthetic ideas exposed by Mairena in Arte Poética.
A version of the book of The Nine Gates of the Kingdom of Shadows, also known as the Book of the Nine Gates from the movie The Ninth Gate. Inside each copy of the book were nine engravings, chapter pages, and Latin text with leather binding. The Nine Gates of the Kingdom of Shadows aka De Umbrarum Regni Novem Portis was written by Aristide Torchia in Venice, in 1666. The book contains nine woodcut engravings rumored to be copied from the apocryphal Delomelanicon, a book purportedly written by the Devil himself. The Nine Gates is said to contain within its pages knowledge to raise the Devil and assume great power. The author was burned, along with all his works in 1667. Three copies are known to survive.

See also
List of fictional diaries
False document
Story within a story

References

Further reading

External links
 The Invisible Library - an extensive collection of fictional books, founded and curated by Brian Quinette
 The Invisible Library, Malibu Lake Branch, curated by Fayaway & Hermester Barrington
 Underneath the Bunker - Reviews of Non-existent Books and other art-forms edited by Georgy Riecke